Australe Montes is a mountain on the planet Mars. The name Australe Montes is a classical albedo name. This was approved by International Astronomical Union in 2003.

See also
 List of mountains on Mars

References

External links 
 Gazetteer of Planetary Nomenclature

Mountains on Mars
Mare Australe quadrangle